Shivaji Science College, Nagpur, established in 1967, is a general degree science college in Nagpur, Maharashtra. This college offers different courses in science. It is affiliated to Rashtrasant Tukadoji Maharaj Nagpur University.

Departments

Physics
Chemistry
Mathematics
Statistics
Electronics
Geology
Botany
Zoology
Computer Science
microbiology
Biotechnology

Accreditation
The college is  recognized by the University Grants Commission (UGC).

References

External links
http://www.sscnagpur.edu.in/

Colleges affiliated to Rashtrasant Tukadoji Maharaj Nagpur University
Educational institutions established in 1967
1967 establishments in Maharashtra
Universities and colleges in Maharashtra
Universities and colleges in Nagpur
Science and technology in Nagpur